The 2019 Darwin Triple Crown (formally known as 2019 BetEasy Darwin Triple Crown) was a motor racing event for the Supercars Championship, held on the weekend of 14-16 June 2019. The event was held at Hidden Valley Raceway near Darwin in the Northern Territory and consisted of two races, 120 and 200 kilometres in length. It was the seventh event of fifteen in the 2019 Supercars Championship and hosted Races 15 and 16 of the season.

DJR Team Penske's Scott McLaughlin became the first driver in the history of the event to win the Triple Crown by winning both races and pole position in the Top Ten Shootout.

Report

Background

Entry alterations
Brad Jones Racing entered an additional Holden Commodore ZB for Jack Smith, his third wildcard entry of the season.

References

Darwin Triple Crown
Darwin Triple Crown
Sport in Darwin, Northern Territory
2010s in the Northern Territory
Motorsport in the Northern Territory